Ahsham-e Sartal (also Romanized as Aḩshām-e Sartal) is a village in Delvar Rural District, Delvar District, Tangestan County, Bushehr Province, Iran. At the 2006 census, its population was 359, in 86 families.

References 

Populated places in Tangestan County